MacTheRipper is a Mac OS X application that enables users to create a playable copy of the contents of a Video DVD by defeating the Content Scramble System. During this process it may optionally modify or disable the DVD region code or the User operation prohibition features of the copied data. The previous lack of an OS X equivalent to the PC software DVDShrink gave this standalone DVD ripper widespread popularity among Macintosh users.

The current public release is version 2.6.6. The latest version, v4.2.7, is available at the MTR-4 forum, which is accessible only after a registration with, and an approval from, an administrator. Even documentation such as pricing (it's no longer free) and the FAQ are locked off.

Legal issues 
Previous releases of MacTheRipper violated the GNU General Public License (GPL) of the libdvdread and libdvdcss software libraries, on which MacTheRipper is built.  However, with MacTheRipper 4 and newer the libdvdread and libdvdcss libraries are distributed separately and must be installed separately for MacTheRipper to work.

The creation and distribution of MacTheRipper may violate the anti-circumvention laws which the U.S. and EU have adopted as part of the WIPO Copyright Treaty. In a case against the maker of a program similar to MacTheRipper, the court found that "the downstream uses of the software [...], whether legal or illegal, are not relevant to  determining whether [the manufacturer] itself is violating the statute." In that case and others that followed it, the court found the software manufacturer in violation of the DMCA.

See also
DVD ripping: an article about extracting the content of DVD, CD, and Blu-ray discs
HandBrake: a free open-source transcoder application for converting DVD content into other formats

References

External links 
Official MacTheRipper Support Forums
MacTheRipper on MacUpdate
Download MacTheRipper 2.6.6
What is MacTheRipper?

DVD rippers
Freeware
MacOS-only software